The First Tee Arkansas Classic was a golf tournament on the Nationwide Tour. It was played from 2001 to 2004. It was played at Diamante Golf Club in Hot Springs Village, Arkansas.

In 2004 the winner earned $90,000.

Winners

Former Korn Ferry Tour events
Golf in Arkansas
Recurring sporting events established in 2001
Recurring sporting events disestablished in 2004
2001 establishments in Arkansas
2004 disestablishments in Arkansas